Chan Ming Kai (born 7 October 1980) is a Malaysian politician who has served as the Political Secretary to Prime Minister Anwar Ibrahim since December 2022. He served as the Member of Parliament (MP) for Alor Setar from May 2018 to November 2022, Member of the Perlis State Legislative Assembly (MLA) for Indera Kayangan from May 2013 to May 2018 and MLA of Perak for Simpang Pulai from March 2008 to May 2013. He is a member of the People's Justice Party (PKR), a component party of the Pakatan Harapan (PH) coalition.

Personal life 
Chan attended University of Technology, Malaysia, where he received Bachelor of Technology Management in 2002. He later received another bachelor's degree in law from University of London in 2007 by self study.

Political career 
Chan was first elected as people's representative in the 2008 general election winning the state constituency of Simpang Pulai, Perak. In the 2013 general election, Chan wrestled the Indera Kayangan state constituency seat in Perlis from the predecessor, Malaysian Chinese Association (MCA)'s Por Choo Chor.

In the 2018 general election, Chan was elected as Member of Parliament for the constituency of Alor Setar in Kedah.

Election results

External links

References

Living people
1980 births
People from Perak
Malaysian politicians of Chinese descent
People's Justice Party (Malaysia) politicians
Members of the Dewan Rakyat
Members of the Perlis State Legislative Assembly
Members of the Perak State Legislative Assembly
Alumni of the University of London
21st-century Malaysian politicians